Palatuwa Gunarathana Central College (commonly known as "Gunarathana College") is a government school for boys and girls in Palatuwa, Matara, Sri Lanka. It is located in Palatuwa Village. The college is situated in a hilly area, close to Matara Akuressas's main road. The college was founded as a Buddhist school in 1924. The college enrolls over 2500 students from primary level to secondary level education with 130 teachers.

History
In 1924, Ver. Atampala Gunarathana Thero, an incumbent of Unella Sri Nagarama Purana Viharaya, started a school using coconut foliage and wattle near Palatuwa Bauddodaya Piriwena. It began as a private Buddhist school. The first students were Mahanayake of Shiyamopalee Chapter and Mahanayake of Sri Rohana Chapter Venerable Rajakeeya Pandith Aththudawe Sri Rahula Thero (Laic Name Mr. Dayananda) and Dandina Samarasinghe Dissanayake, mother of President Mahinda Rajapaksa. The first principal was W.H.S. Jayawardena.

Principals

College Houses
College Houses' Names and Colours:

Gallery

External links 

 OLD Student Ver. Aththudawe Siri Rahula
 OLD Student Mr. Sirisena Wijewardena
 Prasidenta saing

Provincial schools in Sri Lanka
Schools in Matara District